is a Japanese badminton player. She is a two-time world champion in the women's doubles. Nagahara attended Aomori Yamada High School, and was part of the Japanese national junior team that won the bronze medals at the 2013, 2014 Asian and 2014 World Junior Championships. She won her first senior international title at the 2014 Smiling Fish International in the women's doubles event partnered with Mayu Matsumoto. In national events, she plays for the Hokuto Bank team. Nagahara was awarded as the 2018 Most Improved Player of the Year by the BWF together with her partner Mayu Matsumoto. They obtained the honour after winning the 2018 BWF World Championships title and improving their ranking from 14 to 3 in the world. On 30 April 2019, she reached a career high as the women's doubles world No. 1.

Career

2021 
In March, Nagahara and her partner Mayu Matsumoto won their first World Tour Super 1000 title in the All England Open defeating their compatriots, the defending champion, and current world number 1, Yuki Fukushima and Sayaka Hirota in the final. She competed at the 2020 Summer Olympics partnering Matsumoto as 3rd seeds, and her pace was stopped by Kim So-yeong and Kong Hee-yong of South Korea in the quarter-finals.

Achievements

BWF World Championships 
Women's doubles

Asian Championships 
Women's doubles

BWF World Tour (4 titles, 9 runners-up) 
The BWF World Tour, which was announced on 19 March 2017 and implemented in 2018, is a series of elite badminton tournaments sanctioned by the Badminton World Federation (BWF). The BWF World Tour is divided into levels of World Tour Finals, Super 1000, Super 750, Super 500, Super 300 (part of the HSBC World Tour), and the BWF Tour Super 100.

Women's doubles

BWF Grand Prix (2 titles, 4 runners-up) 
The BWF Grand Prix had two levels, the Grand Prix and Grand Prix Gold. It was a series of badminton tournaments sanctioned by the Badminton World Federation (BWF) and played between 2007 and 2017.

Women's doubles

Mixed doubles

  BWF Grand Prix Gold tournament
  BWF Grand Prix tournament

BWF International Challenge/Series (1 title) 
Women's doubles

  BWF International Challenge tournament
  BWF International Series tournament

Performance timeline

National team 
 Junior level

 Senior level

Individual competitions

Senior level

Women's doubles

Mixed doubles

References

External links
 
 

1996 births
Living people
Sportspeople from Hokkaido
Japanese female badminton players
World No. 1 badminton players
Badminton players at the 2020 Summer Olympics
Olympic badminton players of Japan
21st-century Japanese women